Paul Jones may refer to:

Sports

Association football
Paul Jones (footballer, born 1953), former Bolton Wanderers defender
Paul Jones (footballer, born 1965), English former footballer for Walsall and Wolverhampton Wanderers
Paul Jones (footballer, born 1967), Wales international goalkeeper
Paul Jones (footballer, born 1974), former Birmingham City winger
Paul Jones (footballer, born 1976), former Wrexham defender
Paul Jones (footballer, born 1978), former Oldham Athletic defender
Paul Jones (footballer, born 1986), goalkeeper, currently with King's Lynn Town

Other sports
Paul Jones (basketball) (born 1989), American basketball player
Paul Jones (boxer) (born 1966), British former professional boxer
Paul Jones (mixed martial artist) (born 1963), former mixed martial artist
Paul Jones (wrestler) (1942–2018), retired professional wrestler and manager
Paul Jones (American football) (born 1992), American football quarterback
Paul Jones (sportscaster), born 1958, radio play-by-play man for the Toronto Raptors

Politics and government
Paul Jones (Australian politician) (1878–1972), Australian politician
Paul Jones (Navajo Chairman) (1895–1971), chairman of Navajo Tribal Council
Paul Jones (judge) (1880–1965), U.S. federal judge
Paul C. Jones (1901–1981), former U.S. Representative from Missouri
Paul F. Jones (1909–1960), first African-American elected to Pittsburgh, Pennsylvania's City Council
Paul W. Jones (born 1960), U.S. Ambassador to Poland and former U.S. Ambassador to Malaysia

Arts and entertainment
Paul Jones (film producer) (1901–1968), American film producer
Paul Jones (singer) (born 1942), BBC Radio 2 DJ and singer in Manfred Mann
Paul Carey Jones (born 1974), Welsh operatic baritone
Paul "Wine" Jones (1946–2005), American blues musician
Paul R. Jones (1928–2010), American collector of African-American art
Paul Jones, 1889 English adaptation of Surcouf (opéra comique)

Other people
Lynching of Paul Jones, 1919
Paul Jones (bishop) (1880–1941), American Episcopal bishop
Paul Jones (computer technologist) (born 1950), American computer technologist
Paul Tudor Jones (born 1954), American hedge fund manager, conservationist and philanthropist

Other uses
Paul Jones (horse) (1917–1930), American thoroughbred racehorse and winner of 1920 Kentucky Derby
Paul Jones, a mixer dance
Paul Jones (1843 ship), a Medford-built ship that brought the first cargo of ice to China

See also
John Paul Jones (disambiguation)
List of people with surname Jones
Paul Jonas (disambiguation)

Jones, Paul